Sergio Moreira (born 11 July 2000) is a South African rugby union player for the  in the Currie Cup. His regular position is lock.

Moreira was named in the  side for the 2022 Currie Cup Premier Division.

References

South African rugby union players
Rugby union locks
Cheetahs (rugby union) players
Free State Cheetahs players
2000 births
Living people
Kamaishi Seawaves players